Benito Kemble (born 27 August 1968 in Nieuw Nickerie, Suriname) is a Dutch former professional footballer who played as a centre-back.

Kemble played in Scottish football for Motherwell and St Johnstone. He scored once for Motherwell in a 6–2 defeat at Rangers.

References

1968 births
Living people
Association football central defenders
Dutch footballers
Surinamese emigrants to the Netherlands
HFC Haarlem players
Almere City FC players
NEC Nijmegen players
VVV-Venlo players
FC Eindhoven players
Eredivisie players
Dutch expatriate footballers
Expatriate footballers in Scotland
Scottish Premier League players
Motherwell F.C. players
St Johnstone F.C. players
Expatriate soccer players in the United States
Syracuse Salty Dogs players